Sir George Frederic Verdon was an Australian politician and public figure who was elected a member of the legislative assembly for Williamstown in 1859. He was also general manager of the English Scottish and Australian Chartered Bank, Melbourne and was elected president of the Public Library, Museums and National Gallery of Victoria in 1883.

Life 

Verdon was a son of the Rev. Edward Verdon, he was born in Bury, Lancashire, England 1834 and was educated at Rossall School. In 1851 he emigrated to Melbourne Australia.

Obtaining a position in the office of Grice Sumner and Company he afterwards went into business at Williamstown, and began his public career as a member of the local municipal council. He was chairman of a conference of municipal delegates and soon afterwards published in 1858 a pamphlet on The Present and Future of Municipal Government in Victoria.

He was elected a member of the legislative assembly for Williamstown in 1859, and in November 1860 joined the Heales ministry as treasurer. He resigned from the ministry in November 1861 but in June 1863 became treasurer in the McCulloch ministry which remained in office until May 1868.

During the parliamentary recess in 1866 Verdon was sent to England to bring the question of the defences of Victoria before the English authorities. He succeeded in obtaining £100,000 towards the cost of a warship, the Cerberus, and the Nelson was given to Victoria as a training-ship. Verdon also floated a loan for public works, and obtained sanction for the establishment of a branch of the Royal Mint at Melbourne.

After his return he suggested the advisability of the colony having a representative in London, and in 1868 the office of agent-general was created, and Verdon was appointed to the position for a period of four years. He made a most favourable impression in London, he had been given the companionship of the bath in 1866, and in 1872 he was created K.C.M.G. He was also elected a fellow of the Royal Society in 1870. On his giving up the agent-generalship he accepted the position of colonial inspector and general manager of the English Scottish and Australian Chartered Bank, Melbourne.

In 1874 Verdon purchased 18 acres of land that had been reserved by the Victorian colonial government for the construction of a country house for the Governor near the top of Mount Macedon. He named the property Alton, after Alton Tower in England and after enlarging the property through purchase of neighbouring holdings, Alton House, a large Venetian Gothic mansion and stately gardens was designed and constructed under his direction.

He was interested in science, art and literature, as a young man he had been an honorary assistant in the Melbourne observatory, and when treasurer he saw that it was properly equipped; he collected objects of art, and became a trustee of the public library, museums and national gallery of Victoria in 1872, was elected vice-president in 1880, and president in 1883. He held this position until his death and showed much interest in the various collections.

References

1834 births
1896 deaths
Knights Commander of the Order of St Michael and St George
Companions of the Order of the Bath
Fellows of the Royal Society
Verdon, George
Verdon, George
Agents-General for Victoria
People from Bury, Greater Manchester
19th-century Australian politicians
Members of the Victorian Legislative Assembly
Treasurers of Victoria 
English emigrants to colonial Australia